Tio Sam Esporte Clube, commonly known as Tio Sam (Uncle Sam), is a Brazilian football and futsal club based in Niterói, Rio de Janeiro state. They finished as Taça Brasil de Futsal runners-up once.

History
The club was founded on March 18, 1990.

Football
They won the Campeonato Carioca Fourth Level in 1995, and the Campeonato Carioca Third Level in 1996.

Futsal
Tio Sam won the Rio de Janeiro city editions of the Campeonato Carioca de Futsal in 1993, 1996, and the Rio de Janeiro state versions of the competition in 1993, 1994, 1995, 1996, 1997 and in 2004. Tio Sam finished as runner-up in the 1998 edition of the Taça Brasil de Futsal.

Achievements

Football
 Campeonato Carioca Third Level:
 Winners (1): 1996
 Campeonato Carioca Fourth Level:
 Winners (1): 1995

Futsal
 Campeonato Carioca de Futsal:
 Winners (8): 1993 (state), 1993 (city), 1996 (city), 1994 (state), 1995 (state), 1996 (state), 1997 (state), 2004 (state)

Stadium
The Tio Sam Esporte Clube football team play their home games at Estádio Gragoatá. The stadium has a maximum capacity of 3,000 people.

References

Association football clubs established in 1990
Futsal clubs established in 1990
Futsal clubs in Brazil
Football clubs in Rio de Janeiro (state)
1990 establishments in Brazil